Berat Hyseni (born 26 October 1986) is a Kosovar footballer, who plays for FC Llapi in the Kosovar Superliga.

Club career
A journeyman striker, Hyseni started his career with Pristina side KF Flamurtari but then moved to Albania with KF Tirana in January 2008 after signing an 18-month contract with a foreign club release clause. However, he only managed to complete 6 unsuccessful months at the club before moving back to Kosovo with KF Prishtina, signing a 12-month contract. After a good season back in Kosovo Hyseni decided on a move back to the Albanian Superliga, this time with Teuta Durres.

References

1986 births
Living people
Kosovo Albanians
Association football forwards
Kosovan footballers
KF Flamurtari players
KF Tirana players
FC Prishtina players
KF Teuta Durrës players
KF Trepça'89 players
KF Hysi players
KF Drenica players
KF Ferizaj players
KF Hajvalia players
KF Llapi players
KF Ballkani players
Football Superleague of Kosovo players
Kategoria Superiore players
Kosovan expatriate footballers
Expatriate footballers in Albania
Kosovan expatriate sportspeople in Albania